Rennick is a surname. Notable people with the surname include:

 Dave Rennick (born 1983), Australian musician
 Gerard Rennick (born 1970), Australian politician
 Rennick Bay, in Antarctica
 Rennick Glacier, in Antarctica
 Rennick Névé, in Antarctica

See also
 Diana Rennik (born 1985), Estonian figure skater
 Rennicks, surname